Kuntur Chukuña (Aymara kunturi condor, chukuña to squat, to cower, 'where the condor squats', also spelled Condor Chucuna, Condor Chucuña) is a mountain in the Andes of Bolivia, about  high. It is situated in the Potosí Department, Antonio Quijarro Province, Tomave Municipality, between the Uyuni salt flat in the west and the town of Porco in the east and southwest of the Nuevo Mundo volcano (Jatun Mundo Quri Warani).

See also
 Sirk'i
 Mount Uyuni
 List of mountains in the Andes

References 

Mountains of Potosí Department